The Riem Arcaden is the largest shopping mall in Munich. It was built in the Messestadt Riem district at Willy-Brandt-Platz according to a design by the  Allmann Sattler Wappner office and opened on 10 March 2004.

The 122,500 m² building complex of the Riem Arcaden city quarter offers space for over 140 shops, cafés and restaurants on three floors and around 61,100 m² of retail space.

In addition to various fashion brands - including brands such as Marc O'Polo or Tommy Hilfiger (company)- technical novelties, sports equipment, accessories, toys and home décor, doctors, a pharmacy, hairdressers, beauty salons as well as a dry cleaner and alteration tailor are also available for the approximately 9 million visitors each year.

On the upper floor there are several cafés surrounded by shops such as Hugendubel, Müller (German trade company) and Zara (retailer), inviting you to linger and relax during your shopping tour.

Food-court 
In the middle part of the ground floor, the so-called food-court, restaurant chains such as Nordsee and McDonald's are represented, but also classic restaurants. This means that there is something for both fast-food fans and fans of traditional cuisine. The gastronomic offer ranges from Indian and Vietnamese to Italian and Bavarian dishes. Whether it's a full lunch or a coffee in between, the Riem Arcaden food court offers something for every taste.

Local supply 
Initially, no other shops or supermarkets were planned for the new Messestadt Riem district created in 1999. For this reason, in addition to its regional importance as a major shopping centre, the Riem Arcaden also played the role of a daily local supplier for an entire district for some time. The lower floor therefore houses many smaller shops as well as shops for daily needs such as Edeka (with a postal agency) and Aldi.

Social responsibility 
As a major focal point of Messestadt Riem, the Riem Arcaden also assume their social responsibility for the neighbourhood: the numerous events in and around the shopping centre serve as a meeting place for visitors and residents alike. Together with local schools, kindergartens and social initiatives, the Riem Arcaden are involved in various charitable projects.

Riem Arcaden City Quarter 
The about 26,000 visitors per day can conveniently park their cars in the car park belonging to the centre with 2,700 parking spaces and, if desired, have them cleaned during their visit. Electric cars can be charged at one of the charging stations provided. In addition to the mall, the Riem Arcaden city quarter offers 30,000 m² of office space, 62 flats and a Novotel hotel with around 278 rooms and a hotel of the Motel One chain with 310 rooms.

Transportation connection 
The transportation connections to the Riem Arcades is ensured by the Bundesautobahn 94 and the U-Bahn station Messestadt-West (right outside the main entrance). In addition to the underground line U2, bus lines 139, 189, 190, 234, 263 and 264 also stop there.

References

External links 

 Riem Arcaden

Buildings and structures in Munich
Shopping malls established in 2004